D. americanus may refer to:
 Daptrius americanus, a bird species
 Deiphon americanus, a trilobite species in the genus Deiphon
 Dictyoclostus americanus, a brachiopod species in the genus Dictyoclostus
 Driloleirus americanus, an earthworm species

See also
 Americanus (disambiguation)